In Greek mythology, Amphissus (Ancient Greek: Ἄμφίσσος) was the son of Apollo and Dryope.  In Ovid's accounts, he is mentioned to be the son of Andraemon and Dryope. Amphissus eventually built a temple to his father in the city he founded, Amphissa.

Mythology 
Apollo found Dryope tending her sheep on a mountainside while she was being accompanied by other dryads. The god hid behind a tree and watched her, and later on, he disguised himself as a turtle in order for him to get closer to her. Dryope claimed the turtle as hers. Then, to scare away the other dryads, Apollo turned into a snake to chased them away and coupled with Dryope. This is how she came with child, Amphissus.

In Ovid's accounts, his mother Dryope picked a lotus for him, which turned out to be a nymph. It caused Dryope to become a lotus tree.

Note

References 

 Antoninus Liberalis, The Metamorphoses of Antoninus Liberalis translated by Francis Celoria (Routledge 1992). Online version at the Topos Text Project.

Children of Apollo
Demigods in classical mythology